Mythic fiction is literature that is rooted in, inspired by, or that in some way draws from the tropes, themes, and symbolism of myth, legend, folklore, and fairy tales. The term is widely credited to Charles de Lint and Terri Windling. Mythic fiction overlaps with urban fantasy and the terms are sometimes used interchangeably, but mythic fiction also includes contemporary works in non-urban settings. Mythic fiction refers to works of contemporary literature that often cross the divide between literary and fantasy fiction.

Windling promoted mythic fiction as the co-editor (with Ellen Datlow) of The Year's Best Fantasy and Horror annual volumes for sixteen years, and as the editor of the Endicott Studio Journal of Mythic Arts.

Though mythic fiction can be loosely based in mythology, it frequently uses familiar mythological personages archetypes (such as tricksters, or the thunderer). This is in contrast to mythopoeia, such as the works of J. R. R. Tolkien, which invent their own legends and folklore or construct entirely new pantheons.

Subgenres
African Mythology. Home to a great many cultures, nations, religions and languages, African Mythology is vastly diverse. Despite no single set of mythos or legends uniting the continent, different cultures and groups share similarities such as the Deity Leza who exists amongst the Bantu people as well as in those from Central and Southern regions of Africa.
Asian Mythology
Folklores & Fairytales
Greek Mythology
Medieval Legends
Native American Folklore
Norse Mythology
Roman Mythology

Notable authors 
Angela Carter - Best known for her collection of short stories known as 'The Bloody Chamber', Angela Carter was a prominent rewriter of Western European fairytales, presenting them in various new lights, predominantly bringing them into the Gothic. 
Gao Xinghian
Madeline Miller - Madeline Miller wrote 'The Song of Achilles' that rewrites the Trojan War featuring a homosexual romance. 
Mia Yun
John Crowley
Rick Riordan - Best known for his series Percy Jackson & The Olympians and Heroes of Olympus, Riordan's books are some of the most popular in the genre, for crossing multiple mythologies.
Susanna Clarke
Zora Neale Hurston - Published a collection of Southern, Black folklore called 'Mules & Men' as well as a fictional study of Caribbean voodoo practices called 'Tell my Horse'.

See also
Fairytale fantasy
List of genres
Matter of Rome
Mythpunk
Slipstream (genre)
Superhero fiction

References 

Fantasy genres